Scottish Financial Enterprise (SFE) is the representative body for Scotland's financial services industry. It is a company limited by guarantee based in Edinburgh.

Member companies range in size from global organisations headquartered in Scotland to small, locally-based support companies drawn from all areas of financial services. SFE's members encompass all of the main sectors within the industry, including banking; fund management and investment management; general insurance, life assurance and pensions; asset servicing; corporate finance and broker services; professional services (law firms, chartered accountants and auditors) and support services. In addition, the membership includes professional bodies (e.g. the Chartered Institute of Bankers in Scotland) and government bodies: the Bank of England and Scottish Enterprise.

The diverse membership reflects Scotland's position as a leading European financial centre; second only to London in the UK. The industry makes a significant contribution to the Scottish economy, accounting for up to one in every ten jobs in Scotland.

SFE's members account for over 80 per cent of people employed within the financial services industry in Scotland, which employs over 143,000 people directly and indirectly.

Board
The chairman of SFE is an ex officio member of the Financial Services Advisory Board of the Scottish Government, which is convened by the First Minister of Scotland.
 Chairman: Philip Grant, appointed June 2019
 Chief executive: Sandy Begbie, appointed October 2020
 Malcolm Buchanan, Chairman, Scotland and Managing Director for Corporate & Commercial Banking, Royal Bank of Scotland
 Sue Dawe, Head of Financial Services, Scotland for EY LLP
 John McGuigan, Group Customer Director, Phoenix Group
 Colin Halpin, Global Head of Market Data Management, Barclays Group
 Anthony Rafferty, Chief Executive, Origo Services Limited
 Vida Rudkin, Managing Director, Morgan Stanley
 Louisa Knox, Solicitor and Partner, Shepherd and Wedderburn LLP
 Rushad Abadan, Group General Counsel, abrdn plc

SFE Initiatives 
SFE examines a range of policy issues which are of interest to the financial services industry in Scotland.  They work closely with governments at all levels to exchange information, provide advice and views and promote the work of the industry.  SFE also works with their members to formulate responses to government consultations in policy areas which affect the financial services industry.

SFE also run a number of strategic initiatives and SFE member policy groups:

·        High Level Strategy Group

·        FinTech Strategic Initiative

·        SFE Young Professionals

·        Sector Policy Groups: Private Client, Investment Management, Professional Services, Cross Sector Forums (Public Affairs & Communications and Human Resources)

Financial Services in Scotland 
 Scotland has a distinguished history in financial services that dates back over 300 years.
 It is one of Europe’s leading financial centres and the second financial hub in the UK outside of London.
 Includes Banking; Fund Management; Insurance, Life Assurance and Pensions; Asset Servicing and Professional Services.
 Employs 86,000 people directly and 57,000 indirectly
 Generates around £8 billion for the Scottish economy, more than eight per cent of Scottish onshore economic activity
 Manages over £800 billion of funds.
 Accounts for 24 per cent of all UK employment in life assurance, and 13 per cent of all banking employment.

Membership

References

External links
Official website

1986 establishments in Scotland
Financial services in Scotland
 
Companies based in Edinburgh
Industry trade groups based in Scotland
Non-profit organisations based in Scotland
Organizations established in 1986